Noggin may refer to:

General
 Noggin or gill (volume), a unit of volume
 Noggin (cup), a small cup
 Noggin, slang for head
 Noggin (protein), a signalling molecule involved in embryonic development
 Noggin or dwang, a carpentry term

Entertainment
 Noggin (brand), an entertainment brand that includes a television network, mobile applications, and international programming blocks
 Noggin the Nog, a BBC children's character and TV series (1959-1965), and a series of children's books
 Noggin (magazine), an American magazine that published art, fiction, cartoons, plus social and political commentary